Bandar Genaveh (also Romanized as Bandar-e Genāveh,  ; also known as Genāveh) is a city in the Central District of Ganaveh County, Bushehr province, Iran, and serves as capital of the county. At the 2006 census, its population was 59,291 in 12,548 households. The following census in 2011 counted 64,110 people in 15,752 households. The latest census in 2016 showed a population of 73,472 people in 19,977 households.

Most of the population speak a dialect of Southern Lorish with some (in some case, great) influence from Bushehri speech. It is the place where the Persian Warlord, and founder of the Qarmatian State Abu Sa'id al-Jannabi originated from. Ganaveh was historically famous for its pearl fishing and tiraz production, but it seems to have already been in decline by the 10th century. The reason may have been because of the Qarmatian wars, or perhaps because of the lack of water supplies. It had been the port of Bishapur and then Kazerun.

See also
Arrajan

References 

Cities in Bushehr Province
Populated places in Ganaveh County